Melos is an island in Greece, known in history for the Battle of Melos in 415 BC.

Melos may also refer to:
MELOS (Mars Exploration with a Lander-Orbiter Synergy), proposed Japanese Mars exploration mission
Melos (album), a 1973 album by Cervello
Melos (Acarnania), a village of ancient Acarnania, Greece
Groupe Melos, formed in 1950 by Anne Terrier Laffaille and Robert Caby
Melos Ensemble, London-based classical chamber music group 1950-present
Melos Quartet, German string quartet  1965-2005
Melos, a 2008 album by Vassilis Tsabropoulos

See also
, a Japanese short story by Osamu Dazai
Tera Melos Sacramento band